In chemistry, a chemical test is a qualitative or quantitative procedure designed to identify, quantify, or characterise a chemical compound or chemical group.

Purposes
Chemical testing might have a variety of purposes, such as to:
 Determine if, or verify that, the requirements of a specification, regulation, or contract are met
 Decide if a new product development program is on track: Demonstrate proof of concept
 Demonstrate the utility of a proposed patent
 Determine the interactions of a sample with other known substances
 Determine the composition of a sample
 Provide standard data for other scientific, medical, and Quality assurance functions
 Validate suitability for end-use
 Provide a basis for  Technical communication
 Provide a technical means of comparison of several options
 Provide evidence in legal proceedings

Biochemical tests
 Clinistrips quantitatively test for sugar in urine
 The Kastle-Meyer test tests for the presence of blood
 Salicylate testing is a category of drug testing that is focused on detecting salicylates such as acetylsalicylic acid for either biochemical or medical purposes.
 The Phadebas test tests for the presence of saliva for forensic purposes
 Iodine solution tests for starch
 The Van Slyke determination tests for specific amino acids
 The Zimmermann test tests for ketosteroids
 Seliwanoff's test differentiates between aldose and ketose sugars
 Test for lipids: add ethanol to sample, then shake; add water to the solution, and shake again. If fat is present, the product turns milky white.
The Sakaguchi test detects the presence of arginine in protein
The Hopkins–Cole reaction tests for the presence of tryptophan in proteins
The nitroprusside reaction tests for the presence of free thiol groups of cysteine in proteins
The Sullivan reaction tests for the presence of cysteine and cystine in proteins
The Acree–Rosenheim reaction tests for the presence of tryptophan in proteins
The Pauly reaction tests for the presence of tyrosine or histidine in proteins
Heller's test tests for the presence of albumin in urine
Gmelin's test tests for the presence of bile pigments in urine
Hay's test tests for the presence of bile pigments in urine

Reducing sugars

 Barfoed's test tests for reducing polysaccharides or disaccharides
 Benedict's reagent tests for reducing sugars or aldehydes
 Fehling's solution tests for reducing sugars or aldehydes, similar to Benedict's reagent
 Molisch's test tests for carbohydrates
 Nylander's test tests for reducing sugars
 Rapid furfural test distinguishes between glucose and fructose

Proteins and polypeptides
 The bicinchoninic acid assay tests for proteins
 The Biuret test tests for proteins and polypeptides
 Bradford protein assay measures protein quantitatively
 The Phadebas amylase test determines alpha-amylase activity

Organic tests
 The carbylamine reaction tests for primary amines
 The Griess test tests for organic nitrite compounds
 The iodoform reaction tests for the presence of methyl ketones, or compounds which can be oxidized to methyl ketones
 The Schiff test detects aldehydes
 Tollens' reagent tests for aldehydes (known as the silver mirror test) 
 The Zeisel determination tests for the presence of esters or ethers
Lucas' reagent is used to distinguish between primary, secondary and tertiary alcohols.
 The bromine test is used to test for the presence of unsaturation and phenols.

Inorganic tests
 Barium chloride tests for sulfates
 The Beilstein test tests for halides qualitatively
 The bead test tests for certain metals
 The Carius halogen method measures halides quantitatively.
 Chemical tests for cyanide test for the presence of cyanide, CN−
 Copper sulfate tests for the presence of water
 Flame tests test for metals
 The Gilman test tests for the presence of a Grignard reagent
 The Kjeldahl method quantitatively determines the presence of nitrogen
 Nessler's reagent tests for the presence of ammonia
 Ninhydrin tests for ammonia or primary amines
 Phosphate tests test for phosphate
 The sodium fusion test tests for the presence of nitrogen, sulfur, and halides in a sample
 The Zerewitinoff determination tests for any acidic hydrogen
 The Oddy test tests for acid, aldehydes, and sulfides
 Gunzberg's test tests for the presence of hydrochloric acid
 Kelling's test tests for the presence of lactic acid

See also
Independent test organization
Medical test
Test method

References

 
Analytical chemistry
Measurement